The town of Ampthill in Bedfordshire, England was administered as a Local Government District from 1893 to 1894 and an Urban District from 1894 to 1974.

Prior to 1893 the town had formed part of the Ampthill Rural Sanitary District, which had been created in 1875 covering the same area as the Ampthill Poor Law Union. On 18 February 1893 a Local Government District was established for the town, covering the whole parish of Ampthill, removing it from the Ampthill Rural Sanitary District. The first meeting of the new Local Board was held on 14 April 1893 at the town's courthouse on Church Street.

Under the Local Government Act 1894, Local Government Districts became Urban Districts from 31 December 1894.

Premises
The council did not have purpose-built offices of its own. Until 1920 it generally held its meetings at the courthouse. A new fire station for the town was built at 10 Bedford Street in 1902–1903, and in 1920 the council took over a large room there for meetings, becoming known as the Council Chamber. Administrative office functions were carried out at 88 Dunstable Street, which was the office of the solicitor who acted as clerk to the council.

In 1954 the fire station moved to new a new building in Oliver Street. The whole building at 10 Bedford Street was then converted to become offices for the council, which remained based there until its abolition.

Abolition
Ampthill Urban District was abolished under the Local Government Act 1972, being replaced by the Mid Bedfordshire District, which came into being on 1 April 1974. The area now forms part of Central Bedfordshire. A successor parish was created for the town, called Ampthill Town Council.

References

Ampthill
Districts of England created by the Local Government Act 1894
Districts of England abolished by the Local Government Act 1972
History of Bedfordshire
Local government in Bedfordshire
Urban districts of England